Endotricha approximalis is a species of snout moth in the genus Endotricha. It is found in Java, the Philippines, the New Hebrides, Woodlark Island, New Guinea, Australia, China (Hainan) and Vanuatu.

References

Moths described in 1895
Endotrichini